Colin Spence (born 7 January 1960) was a Scottish footballer who played for Falkirk, Alloa Athletic, Stenhousemuir and Dumbarton.

References

1960 births
Scottish footballers
Dumbarton F.C. players
Falkirk F.C. players
Alloa Athletic F.C. players
Stenhousemuir F.C. players
Scottish Football League players
Living people
Association football forwards
Association football midfielders